Néstor Duarte Carassa (born 8 September 1990) is a Peruvian footballer who currently plays for Academia Cantolao in the Torneo Descentralizado, as a center back.

Club career

Universitario
Before the 2007 FIFA U-17 World Cup started, Universitario only had contributed 2 players to the U-17 national team; Gary Correa and Juan Zevallos. After the U-17 World Cup, Universitario began to sign several of the U-17 players. Duarte was one of the first U-17 players to sign with Universitario and he made his debut on November 11, 2007 playing against Sport Boys which they won 3-1. Duarte also became a regular starting defender after that game.

International career
Duarte was the captain of the Peru national under-17 football team. With the national team, he qualified for the 2007 FIFA U-17 World Cup in South Korea, with other youth players like Reimond Manco, Carlos Bazalar, Manuel Calderón, Irven Ávila, and Gary Correa. They made it through the group stage, passed the Round of 16, but were eliminated in the quarterfinals.

Honours

Club
Universitario de Deportes
 Apertura: 2008
Torneo Descentralizado (2): 2009,  2013
U-20 Copa Libertadores (1): 2011

References

External links

1990 births
Living people
Sportspeople from Callao
Peruvian footballers
Peru international footballers
Peruvian Primera División players
Club Universitario de Deportes footballers
Sport Huancayo footballers
Academia Deportiva Cantolao players
Association football central defenders